Yaroslav I is the name of:

 Yaroslav I the Wise (ca. 970–1054), prince of Kiev
 Yaroslav I of Halych  (ca. 1135–1187)